Tuileries (lit. "tile factories") is a station on Line 1 of the Paris Métro. It is situated in the 1st arrondissement, under the Rue de Rivoli.

Location
Like most stations on Line 1, Tuileries lies on an east–west axis (Axe historique) from La Défense in the west to Vincennes in the east. Specifically, it is located underneath the Rue de Rivoli just near the Jardin des Tuileries, for which the station is named.

History
The station opened on 19 July 1900 with the entry into service of the first section of line 1 between Porte de Vincennes and Porte Maillot.

From the 1960s until the end of the 20th century, the station walls were clad in metal sheets with green horizontal posts and illuminated gold advertising frames, and the metal beams supporting the station ceiling were painted green. Before the removal of this arrangement during the renovation of the platforms on the occasion of the metro's centenary, it was completed with white Motte style seats. The new decoration was inaugurated in 2000.

As part of the automation of line 1, the station platforms were upgraded on the weekend of 18 and 19 October 2008, then fitted with platform screen doors in November 2010.

In 2019, 2,614,837 travelers entered this station which placed it in 199th position among metro stations for its usage.

Passenger services

Access
The station has two entrances leading to Rue de Rivoli, to the right of the entrance to the Jardin des Tuileries facing Rue du Vingt-Neuf-Juillet:
 Entrance 1: 206, Rue de Rivoli;
 Entrance 2: 210, Rue de Rivoli.
Each is decorated with a Guimard entrance listed as a historical monument by a decree of 29 May 1978.

Station layout

Platforms
Tuileries is a standard configuration station. It has two platforms separated by the metro tracks. The ceiling consists of a metal deck, the beams of which, silver in color, are supported by vertical walls. Since the introduction of the six-car train line in the 1960s, a 15-meter-long crypt, the ceiling of which rests on closely spaced pillars, extends the platform to its western end.

The decoration of the platforms, created for the centenary of the Metro and line 1, is "cultural" evoking the cultural history of the Metro in relation to that of the twentieth century thanks to thematic panels illustrated with iconic images by decades. The lighting is indirect, projected onto the walls and the vaults of the ceiling above the platforms. The beveled white ceramic tiles only cover the tunnel outlets, the outlets of the corridors and the walls under the crypt. The vault of the crypt is painted white, while its columns are covered with small flat white ceramic tiles laid vertically. The advertising frames are metallic and the name of the station is written in Parisine font on enamelled plates. The platforms are equipped with wooden slatted benches as well as platform screen doors.

Bus connections
The station is served by line 72 of the RATP Bus Network, and, at night, by lines N11 and N24 of the Noctilien network.

In popular culture
It was the ostensible setting of one portion of the film Paris, je t'aime in which an American tourist (Steve Buscemi) waiting at the station becomes involved in the conflict between a young couple. In fact, the scene was filmed at the closed Porte des Lilas—Cinema metro station.

Gallery

References

Paris Métro stations in the 1st arrondissement of Paris
Railway stations in France opened in 1900